Akram Aldroubi is an American mathematician known for his work in sampling theory, harmonic analysis, and their applications to signal and image processing as well as biomedical data analysis.

Education 
Aldroubi received a diplôme in electrical engineering from École Polytechnique Fédérale de Lausanne, in Switzerland, in 1982. He studied mathematics at Carnegie Mellon University, earning his master’s in 1984 and his doctorate in 1987.

Career 
After Carnegie, Aldroubi worked as a researcher at the National Institutes of Health. He moved to the Department of Mathematics at Vanderbilt University in 1997 where he currently holds a position of professor. He has worked on sampling theory, wavelets, frame theory and their applications to signal and image processing.

In 2009, he was awarded the Fulbright Foreign Scholarship to continue teaching and conduct research. In 2014, Aldroubi was inducted as a Fellow of the American Mathematical Society for "contributions to modern harmonic analysis and its applications, and for building bridges between mathematics and other areas of science and engineering."

Bibliography

References 

Living people
20th-century American mathematicians
Vanderbilt University faculty
École Polytechnique Fédérale de Lausanne alumni
Carnegie Mellon University alumni
Fellows of the American Mathematical Society
National Institutes of Health faculty
Year of birth missing (living people)
21st-century American mathematicians